George Edward Morse (April 11, 1920 – December 6, 2012) was an American professional basketball player. He played in the National Basketball League for the Chicago Bruins in two games and averaged 1.0 points per game. He attended Marquette University on an athletics scholarship but left after his freshman year to concentrate on his professional career.

References

External links
Chicago Tribune obituary

1920 births
2012 deaths
United States Army personnel of World War II
American men's basketball players
Basketball players from Chicago
Chicago Bruins players
Forwards (basketball)
Guards (basketball)
Marquette University alumni
Military personnel from Illinois